Rianne is a feminine given name which may refer to:

Rianne Donders-de Leest (born 1960), Dutch politician
Rianne Guichelaar (born 1983), Dutch water polo player
Rianne ten Haken (born 1986), Dutch model
Rianne Letschert (born 1976), Dutch professor of victimology

See also
Rian, a given name and surname

Feminine given names